Cotruș is a Romanian surname. Notable people with the surname include:

Aron Cotruș (1891–1961), Romanian poet and diplomat 
Ovidiu Cotruș (1926–1977), Romanian essayist and literary critic

Romanian-language surnames